Zhu Cilang (26 February 1629 – June 1644) was a crown prince of the Ming dynasty. He was the eldest son of the Chongzhen Emperor and Lady Zhou, Empress Xiaojielie, and he was made the crown prince in 1630.

Family
Zhu Cilang's crown princess was Ning Hong's (寧浤) daughter, Consort Ning (寧妃) who died at 19.

Ancestry

Notes

References

1629 births
1644 deaths
Ming dynasty imperial princes
Disappeared princes